PTV Vissim is a microscopic multi-modal traffic flow simulation software package developed by PTV Planung Transport Verkehr AG in Karlsruhe, Germany. The name is derived from "Verkehr In Städten - SIMulationsmodell" (German for "Traffic in cities - simulation model"). PTV Vissim was first developed in 1992 and is today a global market leader.

Scope of application
The scope of application ranges from various issues of traffic engineering (transport engineering, transportation planning, signal timing), public transport, urban planning over fire protection (evacuation simulation) to 3d visualization (computer animation, architectural animation) for illustrative purpose and communication to the general public.

PTV Vissim is part of the PTV Vision Traffic Suite which also includes PTV Visum (traffic analysis and forecasting) and PTV Vistro (signal optimisation and traffic impact).

Modelling

Microscopic simulation
The basic traffic model ruling the movement of vehicles was developed by Rainer Wiedemann in 1974 at Karlsruhe University. It is a car-following model that considers physical and psychological aspects of the drivers.

The model underlying pedestrian dynamics is the Social Force Model by Dirk Helbing et al. from 1995.

"Microscopic simulation", sometimes called microsimulation, means each entity (car, train, person) of reality is simulated individually, i.e. it is represented by a corresponding entity in the simulation, thereby considering all relevant properties. The same holds for the interactions between the entities. The opposite would be a "macroscopic simulation", in which the description of reality is shifted from individuals to "averaged" variables like flow and density. The corresponding product from the same manufacturer is called Visum.

Transport modes
In Vissim the following types of traffic can be simulated, and mutually interact:
 Vehicles (cars, buses, and trucks)
 Public transport (trams, buses)
 Cycles (bicycles, motorcycles)
 Pedestrians
 Rickshaws

Vehicle interactions
In VISSIM, vehicle conflict points can be modelled using Priority Rules, Conflict Areas or Signal Heads.

Signals can be modelled with fixed-time plans, or various modules such as VAP (Vehicle Actuated Programming) are available to model on-demand signals and other types of control and coordination.

Versions and associated files
Versions up to 5.40 created .INP files which used a proprietary language. Versions 6 and later created .INPX files which use an XML-based language. Both produce human-readable code:

.INP example
CONNECTOR 10011 NAME "West Road" LABEL  0.00 0.00
  FROM LINK 30 LANES 1 AT 34.905
  OVER 574805 165119 0.00000  OVER 574805 165119 0.000  OVER 574805 165120 0.000  OVER 574805 165120 0.000  
  TO LINK 2 LANES 1 AT 0.358  BEHAVIORTYPE 1  DISPLAYTYPE 1  ALL
  DX_EMERG_STOP 5.000 DX_LANE_CHANGE 200.000
  GRADIENT 0.00000  COST 0.00000  SURCHARGE 0.00000  SURCHARGE 0.00000
  SEGMENT LENGTH 10.000 ANIMATION

.INPX example
<links>
		<link assumSpeedOncom="60" consVehInDynPot="false" costPerKm="0" desSpeedFact="1" direction="ALL" displayType="1" emergStopDist="5" gradient="0" hasOvtLn="false" isPedArea="false" level="1" linkBehavType="1" linkEvalAct="false" linkEvalSegLen="10" lnChgDist="200" lnChgDistIsPerLn="false" lnChgEvalAct="true" lookAheadDistOvt="500" mesoFollowUpGap="0" mesoSpeed="50" mesoSpeedModel="VEHICLEBASED" name="Ramsgate Roundabout" netPerfEvalAct="true" no="1" ovtOnlyPT="false" ovtSpeedFact="1.3" showClsfValues="true" showLinkBar="true" showVeh="true" surch1="0" surch2="0" thickness="0" vehDynPotG="3" vehRecAct="true">
			<geometry>
				<linkPolyPts>
					<linkPolyPoint x="553749" y="174493" zOffset="0"/>
					<linkPolyPoint x="553759" y="174463" zOffset="0"/>
					<linkPolyPoint x="553779" y="174401" zOffset="0"/>
					<linkPolyPoint x="553799" y="174333" zOffset="0"/>
				</linkPolyPts>
			</geometry>
		</link>
</links>

References

Further Literature 
 R. Wiedemann, Modelling of RTI-Elements on multi-lane roads. In: Advanced Telematics in Road Transport edited by the Commission of the European Community, DG XIII, Brussels, 1991.
 M. Fellendorf, VISSIM: A microscopic simulation tool to evaluate actuated signal control including bus priority. 64th ITE Annual Meeting, 1994. PDF
 L. Bloomberg and J. Dale, Comparison of VISSIM and CORSIM Traffic Simulation Models on a Congested Network. Transportation Research Record 1727:52-60, 2000. PDF
 D. Helbing, I. Farkas, and T. Vicsek, Simulating dynamical features of escape panic. Nature, 407:487–490, 2000. 
 M. Fellendorf and P. Vortisch, Validation of the microscopic traffic flow model VISSIM in different real-world situations. Transportation Research Board, 2001. PDF
 D. Helbing, I.J. Farkas, P. Molnar, and T. Vicsek, Simulation of Pedestrian Crowds in Normal and Evacuation Situations. In Schreckenberg and Sharma editors. Pedestrian and Evacuation Dynamics, Duisburg, 2002. Springer-Verlag Berlin Heidelberg.
 B.B. Park and J.D. Schneeberger, Microscopic Simulation Model Calibration and Validation: Case Study of VISSIM Simulation Model for a Coordinated Actuated Signal System. Transportation Research Record 1856:185-192, 2003. PDF
 T. Werner and D. Helbing, The Social Force Pedestrian Model Applied to Real Life Scenarios. In E. Galea (editor) Pedestrian and Evacuation Dynamics: 2nd International Conference, Old Royal Naval College, University of Greenwich, London, 2003. CMS Press.
 G. Gomes, A. May, and R. Horowitz, Congested Freeway Microsimulation Model Using VISSIM. Transportation Research Record 1876:71-81, 2004. PDF
 R. Jagannathan and J.G. Bared, Design and Operational Performance of Crossover Displaced Left-Turn Intersections Transportation Research Record 1881:1-10, 2004.
 K.Y.K. Leung   T.-S. Dao   C.M. Clark, and J.P. Huissoon, Development of a microscopic traffic simulator for inter-vehicle communication application research. In Intelligent Transportation Systems Conference 1286–1291, 2006.
 M.M. Ishaque and R.B. Noland, Trade-offs between vehicular and pedestrian traffic using micro-simulation methods. Transport Policy 14(2):124-138, 2007.
 W. Burghout, J. Wahlstedt, Hybrid Traffic Simulation with Adaptive Signal Control Transportation Research Record 1999:191-197, 2007. PDF
 A. Johansson, D. Helbing, and P.K. Shukla, Specification of the Social Force Pedestrian Model by Evolutionary Adjustment to Video Tracking Data. Advances in Complex Systems 10(4):271–288, 2007.

External links
 PTV Vissim official homepage
 YouTube Channel with many PTV Vissim animations 
 Animated PTV Vissim example of a roundabout created by BrennerPlan GmbH.

Traffic simulation
1992 software